The 1984 German Formula Three Championship was a multi-event motor racing championship for single-seat open wheel formula racing cars held across Europe. The championship featured drivers competing in two-litre Formula Three racing cars which conformed to the technical regulations, or formula, for the championship. It commenced on 11 March at Zolder and ended at the same place on 21 October after twelve rounds.

Malte Bongers Motorsport driver Kurt Thiim won the championship battle. He was victorious at Zolder, Kaufbeuren, Nürburgring and Salzburgring.  Volker Weidler lost 13 points to Thiim and finished as runner-up with wins at Mainz Finthen, Wunstorf and Zolder. Harald Brutschin and Cor Euser were the only other drivers who were able to win a race in the season.

Teams and drivers

Calendar

Results

Championship standings
Points are awarded as follows:

References

External links
 

German Formula Three Championship seasons
Formula Three season
1984 in Formula Three